Abdul Momin Mondol is a Bangladesh Awami League politician, Businessman and incumbent Member of Parliament of Sirajganj-5.

Early life
Mondol was born on 1 January 1980. He has a B.B.A. degree. His father, Abdul Majid Mandal, was the member of parliament from Sirajganj-5 from 2014 to 2018.

Career
Mondol was elected to parliament from Sirajganj-5 as a Bangladesh Awami League candidate 30 December 2018.

References

Awami League politicians
Living people
11th Jatiya Sangsad members
1980 births
People from Sirajganj District